The 1988 Winston 500 was the ninth stock car race of the 1988 NASCAR Winston Cup Series season and the 19th iteration of the event. The race was held on Sunday, May 1, 1988, before an audience of 135,000 in Lincoln, Alabama at Talladega Superspeedway, a 2.66 miles (4.28 km) permanent triangle-shaped superspeedway. The race took the scheduled 188 laps to complete. In the closing laps of the race, Jackson Brothers Motorsports driver Phil Parsons would fiercely defend the field en route to his first and only career NASCAR Winston Cup Series victory and his only victory of the season. To fill out the podium, Stavola Brothers Racing driver Bobby Allison and Hendrick Motorsports driver Geoff Bodine would finish second and third, respectively.

Background 

Talladega Superspeedway, originally known as Alabama International Motor Superspeedway (AIMS), is a motorsports complex located north of Talladega, Alabama. It is located on the former Anniston Air Force Base in the small city of Lincoln. The track is a tri-oval and was constructed in the 1960s by the International Speedway Corporation, a business controlled by the France family. Talladega is most known for its steep banking and the unique location of the start/finish line that's located just past the exit to pit road. The track currently hosts the NASCAR series such as the NASCAR Cup Series, Xfinity Series and the Camping World Truck Series. Talladega is the longest NASCAR oval with a length of 2.66-mile-long (4.28 km) tri-oval like the Daytona International Speedway, which also is a 2.5-mile-long (4 km) tri-oval.

Entry list 

 (R) denotes rookie driver.

Qualifying 
Qualifying was split into two rounds. The first round was held on Thursday, April 28, at 3:00 PM CST. Each driver would have one lap to set a time. During the first round, the top 20 drivers in the round would be guaranteed a starting spot in the race. If a driver was not able to guarantee a spot in the first round, they had the option to scrub their time from the first round and try and run a faster lap time in a second round qualifying run, held on Friday, April 29, at 5:00 PM EST. As with the first round, each driver would have one lap to set a time. One more position, the last starting spot on the field, was given to the driver who was not locked into the top 40 on owner's points.

Four drivers would fail to qualify: Jimmy Horton, Trevor Boys, Connie Saylor, and Ken Bouchard.

Full qualifying results

Race results

References 

1988 NASCAR Winston Cup Series
NASCAR races at Talladega Superspeedway
May 1988 sports events in the United States
1988 in sports in Alabama